Neykurendhoo (Dhivehi: ނޭކުރެންދޫ) is one of the inhabited islands of Haa Dhaalu Atoll administrative division and geographically part of Thiladhummathi Atoll in the north of the Maldives.

History
Neykurendhoo was among the islands severely damaged during the great cyclone of 1821 that hit the northern atolls of the Maldives. This was during the reign of Sultan Muhammad Mueenuddeen I.

Geography

Demography

References

Islands of the Maldives